The River Pitt, also known as the Piddy, is a short tributary of the River Brue in Somerset, England.  It rises near Hardway in the parish of Brewham, and flows for  through the parishes of Shepton Montague and Pitcombe to join the Brue at Cole.

References

Rivers of Somerset
1Pitt